This list of universities in Switzerland lists all public and private higher education institutions accredited and coordinated according the Federal Act on Funding and Coordination of the Swiss Higher Education Sector (short: Federal Higher Education Act, HEdA).

This includes all 12 publicly funded Swiss universities (10 cantonal universities and 2 federal institutes of technology) and a number of public and private Swiss Universities of Applied Sciences and other education institutions, as higher education institutions. The Swiss University Conference and its accreditation body the CRUS-OAQ is responsible for their recognition; an accreditation also defines the right to call itself accordingly.

Universities

Universities of Applied Sciences

Public
Bern University of Applied Sciences, BFH, German-speaking
Fachhochschule Graubünden, FHGR
University of Applied Sciences Northwestern Switzerland, FHNW, German-speaking and English-speaking
University of Applied Sciences of Eastern Switzerland, OST, German-speaking
University of Applied Sciences and Arts of Western Switzerland, HES-SO, French- and German-speaking in Fribourg only
Lucerne University of Applied Sciences and Arts, HSLU, German-speaking
University of Applied Sciences and Arts of Southern Switzerland, SUPSI, Italian-speaking
Zurich University of Applied Sciences, ZFH, German-speaking
Zurich University of Applied Sciences, ZHAW
Zurich University of the Arts ZHdK

Private
Kalaidos University of Applied Sciences

Higher education institutions of art and music
 Accademia Teatro Dimitri, Verscio (part of the SUPSI) 
 Conservatorio della Svizzera italiana, CSI, Lugano (part of the SUPSI)
 Ecole cantonale d'art de Lausanne, ECAL, Lausanne (part of the HES-SO)
 Dipartimento ambiente costruzioni e design, Canobbio  (part of the SUPSI)
 HES-SO Valais-Wallis – Edhéa Ecole de design et haute école d’art, Sierre (part of the HES-SO)
 Haute école d'art et de design Genève, HEAD, Geneva (part of the HES-SO) 
 Haute école de musique de Genève, HEM, Neuchâtel (part of the HES-SO)
 Haute Ecole de Musique de Lausanne, HEMU, Lausanne, Fribourg, Sion (part of the HES-SO) 
 HE-Arc Conservation-restauration, Lausanne (part of the HES-SO) 
 Hochschule der Künste, Bern, HKB (part of the BFH) 
 Hochschule für Gestaltung und Kunst FHNW (part of the FHNW)
 Hochschule für Musik FHNW (part of the FHNW)
 Hochschule Luzern – Departement Design & Kunst (part of the HSLU)
 Hochschule Luzern – Departement Musik (part of the HSLU)
 La Manufacture – Haute école des arts de la scène, Lausanne (part of the HES-SO)
 Zürcher Hochschule der Künste ZHdK
 Kalaidos Musikhochschule (part of the Kalaidos University of Applied Sciences)

Universities of teacher education
According to diploma recognition by the EDK / CDIP:
Haute école pédagogique des cantons de Berne, du Jura et de Neuchâtel, HEP-BEJUNE
Haute école pédagogique du canton de Vaud, HEP Vaud
Pädagogische Hochschule Wallis | Haute école pédagogique du Valais, HEP-VS | PH-VS 
Haute école pédagogique Fribourg | Pädagogische Hochschule Freiburg, HEP | PH FR
Hochschulinstitut IVP NMS
Interkantonale Hochschule für Heilpädagogik Zürich, HfH
Pädagogische Hochschule Graubünden | Alta scuola pedagogica dei Grigioni | Scola auta da pedagogia dal Grischun, PHGR
Pädagogische Hochschule Bern, PHBern
Pädagogische Hochschule Luzern, PH Luzern
Pädagogische Hochschule Nordwestschweiz, PH FHNW
Pädagogische Hochschule St. Gallen, PHSG
Pädagogische Hochschule Schaffhausen, PHSH
Pädagogische Hochschule Schwyz, PHSZ
Pädagogische Hochschule Thurgau, PHTG
Pädagogische Hochschule Zürich, PH Zürich
Pädagogische Hochschule Zug, PH Zug
Schweizer Hochschule für Logopädie Rorschach, SHLR
SUPSI – Dipartimento formazione e apprendimento (Ticino), SUPSI-DFA
Swiss Federal University for Vocational Education and Training, SFUVET

Other institutions of the higher education sector
Franklin University Switzerland (university institute)
Hochschule für Wirtschaft Zürich, HWZ (university of applied sciences institute)
Hochschulinstitut Schaffhausen, HSSH (university institute)
International Institute for Management Development, IMD (university institute)
Graduate Institute of International and Development Studies of Geneva, IHEID (university institute)
Schweizerisches universitäres Institut für traditionelle chinesische Medizin, SWISS TCM UNI (university institute)
Stiftung Universitäre Fernstudien Schweiz, Brig (university institute)
SBS Swiss Business School (university of applied sciences institute)
Swiss Federal Institute of Sport Magglingen, SFISM
Staatsunabhängige Theologische Hochschule Basel, STH Basel (university institute)

Accredited institutions according to article 75 paragraph 3 HEdA

Theologische Hochschule Chur, THC

International rankings for the public universities

ARWU

In relation to its population size, Switzerland is the country with the highest number of universities among the 100 best of the Academic Ranking of World Universities (2014–2015).

Switzerland Top Universities in 2020/21 

A list of Switzerland top universities in 2020 as per three major ranking platforms ARWU (Academic Ranking of World Universities), THE (Times Higher Education) and the QS (Quacquarelli Symonds).

See also

List of largest universities by enrollment in Switzerland
Education in Switzerland
Science and technology in Switzerland
List of colleges and universities by country
List of colleges and universities

Notes and references

External links
Official portal of swissuniversities
The State Secretariat for Education, Research and Innovation
Results of University Rankings

Universities
Switzerland
Switzerland